Newfoundland Power Inc. is an electric utility owned by Fortis Inc. which is the primary retailer of electric power in the Canadian province of Newfoundland and Labrador. The company was formed by the Royal Securities Corporation of Montreal in 1924 as the Newfoundland Light & Power Company.

In the year of its incorporation it purchased the assets of the St. John's Light and Power Company which had been formed originally by Robert Gillespie Reid as the St. John's Street Railway Company in 1896.  Those assets included Newfoundland and Labrador's first hydro electric generating station at Petty Harbour, Petty Harbour Hydro Electric Generating Station.

After 1924 Newfoundland Light & Power Company became a subsidiary of the International Power Company, and it remained a subsidiary until 1949, when the parent company sold its shares in it to the general public.

The Newfoundland Light & Power Company supplied the general needs of the St. John's urban area and operated the city's electrical street car system. In 1948 the street railway was disbanded and the company became solely an electric company.

Newfoundland Power operates 23 hydro generating plants, three diesel plants and three gas turbine facilities for a total installed capacity of 139.4 MW.

Historical highlights
 1926 the company increased the generating capacity of the Petty Harbour Generating Station
 1931 completed a 3 MW hydro electric generating station at Pierre's Brook
 1931 laid two 13 kW cables across the Bell Island tickle in Conception Bay to supply the iron ore mines on Bell Island
 1951 purchased from Bowater's Newfoundland Pulp and Paper Mills and Bay of Islands Light and Power Company the distribution systems in Corner Brook and Deer Lake.
 1956 obtained from the Anglo Newfoundland Development Company the distribution system in Grand Falls, Windsor, Bishops Falls and Botwood.
 1958 completed a 12.5 MW hydro electric generating station at Rattling Brook.
 1958 obtained from the Department of Transport the distribution system in Gander.
 1962 converted the Grand Falls, Windsor, Bishop's Falls and Botwood distribution systems from 50 cycles (50 Hz voltage signal) to the North American standard of 60 cycles.
 1966 Union Electric Light and Power Company became part of the Newfoundland Light and Power Company.
 1966 the company had eleven generating plants with an installed capacity of 95 MW.
 1970 the company sold over the one billion kW·h (1 TW·h).
 1981 the company had twenty-one hydro stations, three gas turbines, seven diesel generating plants and one thermal power station for a total installed capacity of 241 MW.
 1987 shareholders of Newfoundland Light & Power Co. form Fortis Inc. as a holding company with 100% ownership of the regulated electrical utility.
 1990 Newfoundland Light & Power Co. changes its corporate name to Newfoundland Power.
 1998 the company changed its legal name from Newfoundland Light & Power Co. to Newfoundland Power Inc.

See also
 Newfoundland and Labrador Power Commission
 Newfoundland and Labrador Hydro

References

External links
 Official site

Electric power companies of Canada
Electric power transmission system operators in Canada
Energy in Newfoundland and Labrador
Fortis Inc.
Companies based in St. John's, Newfoundland and Labrador
Energy companies established in 1924
Non-renewable resource companies established in 1924
1924 establishments in Newfoundland